The Porches is a historic site in Ormond Beach, Florida, United States. It is located at 176 South Beach Street. On October 6, 1988, it was added to the U.S. National Register of Historic Places.

References

External links
 Volusia County listings at National Register of Historic Places
 Volusia County listings at Florida's Office of Cultural and Historical Programs

Gallery

Houses on the National Register of Historic Places in Volusia County, Florida
Vernacular architecture in Florida
Ormond Beach, Florida